Mahamadou Dissa (born 18 May 1979) is a retired Malian footballer who played as a  centre-forward. He represented the Mali national team.

References
 
 

1979 births
Living people
People from Kayes
Association football forwards
Malian footballers
Mali international footballers
Malian expatriate footballers
Chamois Niortais F.C. players
Grenoble Foot 38 players
Stade Brestois 29 players
K.S.K. Beveren players
K.S.V. Roeselare players
K.V. Oostende players
JS Centre Salif Keita players
Ligue 2 players
Belgian Pro League players
Challenger Pro League players
Expatriate footballers in France
Expatriate footballers in Belgium
2002 African Cup of Nations players
2008 Africa Cup of Nations players
Mali under-20 international footballers
Royal FC Mandel United players
21st-century Malian people